Megeuptychia is a genus of satyrid butterflies found in the Neotropical realm.

Species
Listed alphabetically:
Megeuptychia antonoe (Cramer, [1775])
Megeuptychia monopunctata Willmott & Hall, 1995

References

Euptychiina
Butterfly genera
Taxa named by Walter Forster (entomologist)